Raila Amolo Odinga (born 7 January 1945) is a Kenyan politician who served as the Prime Minister of Kenya from 2008 to 2013. He served as the Member of Parliament (MP) for Langata Constituency from 1992 to 2013 and has been the Leader of Opposition in Kenya since 2013. He is the leader of Azimio la Umoja–One Kenya Coalition Party.

Odinga has run to become President of Kenya five times, with none of his attempts being successful - each time alleging electoral fraud.   

In 1997, he finished third as the candidate of the National Development Party (NDP). In 2007, he ran again for the presidency under the Orange Democratic Movement (ODM) and lost to Mwai Kibaki. In 2013, 2017, and 2022, Odinga was the runner-up as a candidate for the Coalition for Reforms and Democracy (CORD), National Super Alliance (NASA) and Azimio la Umoja respectively.  After his loss, he filed for petition against President-elect Ruto at the Supreme Court of Kenya. The court decided against him, and Raila Odinga pledged to respect its ruling.

Early life and education

Kenya Colony
Raila Odinga was born at the Anglican Church Missionary Society Hospital in Maseno, Kisumu District, Nyanza Province on 7 January 1945 to Mary Juma Odinga and Jaramogi Oginga Odinga. His father served as the first Vice President of Kenya under President Jomo Kenyatta. He is a member of the Luo ethnic group. He went to Kisumu Union Primary , Maranda primary in Bondo and Maranda High School where he studied until 1962, when he was transferred by his father to Germany.

East Germany
He spent the next two years at the Herder Institution, which trained foreign students in the German language and was part of the philological faculty at the University of Leipzig in East Germany. He received a scholarship that in 1965 sent him to the Technische Hochschule (technical college) of Magdeburg (now a part of Otto von Guericke University Magdeburg) in the GDR. In 1970, he graduated with a certificate in Welding. While studying in East Germany during the Cold War as a Kenyan he was able to visit West Berlin through the Checkpoint Charlie. When visiting West Berlin, he used to smuggle goods not available in East Berlin and bring them to his friends in East Germany.

Career

Business and entrepreneurship
Odinga returned to Kenya in 1970 and in 1971 he founded the Standard Processing Equipment Construction & Erection Ltd (later renamed East African Spectre), the only company manufacturing liquid petroleum gas cylinders in Kenya.

Civil service career
In 1974, Odinga was appointed group standards manager of the Kenya Bureau of Standards. After holding this position for 4 years, he was promoted to be the deputy director in 1978, a post he held until his 1982 detention.

Political career

1982 Kenyan coup attempt
At 3 a.m. on Sunday, 1 August 1982, a group of soldiers from the Kenya Air Force led by Senior Private Hezekiah Ochuka attempted to overthrow the government of then president Daniel Arap Moi. After the failed attempt to overthrow him, President Moi re-organized Kenya's security architecture, staffing it with his loyalists and then he ensured a law was passed in parliament that gave him emergency powers while placing the provincial administration under the office of the president.

Odinga was arrested and charged with treason after being accused of being among the masterminds of the 1982 coup. He was released six years later in February 1988 but detained again in August of the same year to be released in June 1989.

Detention
In an era of unrelenting human rights abuse by the Kenyan government, Odinga was placed under house arrest for seven months after evidence seemed to implicate him along with his late father Oginga Odinga for collaborating with the plotters of a failed coup attempt against President Daniel Arap Moi in 1982. Hundreds of Kenyan civilians and thousands of rebel soldiers died in the coup. Several foreigners also died. Odinga was later charged with treason and detained without trial for six years.

A biography released 14 years later in July 2006, apparently with Odinga's approval, indicated that Odinga was far more involved in the attempted coup than he had previously admitted. After its publication, some Members of Parliament in Kenya called for Odinga to be arrested and charged, but the statute of limitations had already passed and the information contained in the biography did not amount to an open confession on his part. Among some of his most painful experiences was when his mother died in 1984 but the prison wardens took two months to inform him of her death.

He was released on 6 February 1988 only to be rearrested in September 1988 for his pro-democracy and human rights agitation at a time when the country continued to descend deep into the throes of poor governance and the despotism of single-party rule. multi-party democracy Kenya, was then, by law, a one-party state. His encounters with the authoritarian government generated an aura of intrigue about him and it was probably due to this that his political followers christened him "Agwambo", Luo for "The Mystery" or "Unpredictable", or "Jakom", meaning chairman.

Odinga was released on 12 June 1989, only to be incarcerated again on 5 July 1990, together with Kenneth Matiba, and former Nairobi mayor Charles Rubia, both multiparty system and human rights crusaders. Odinga was finally released on 21 June 1991, and in October he fled the country to Norway amid indications that the increasingly corrupt Kenyan government was attempting to assassinate him without success.

Multi-party politics
At the time of Odinga's departure to Norway, the Forum for the Restoration of Democracy (FORD), a movement formed to agitate for the return of multi-party democracy to Kenya, was newly formed. In February 1992, Odinga returned to join FORD, then led by his father Jaramogi Oginga Odinga. He was elected Vice Chairman of the General Purposes Committee of the party. In the months running up to the 1992 General Election, FORD split into FORD-Kenya, led by Odinga's father Jaramogi Oginga Odinga, and FORD-Asili led by Kenneth Matiba. Odinga became Ford-Kenya's Deputy Director of Elections. Odinga won the Langata Constituency parliamentary seat, previously held by Philip Leakey of KANU. Odinga became the second father of multi-party democracy in Kenya after Kenneth Matiba.

When Jaramogi Oginga Odinga died in January 1994 and Michael Wamalwa Kijana succeeded him as FORD-Kenya chairman, Odinga challenged him for the party leadership. The elections were marred by controversy after which Odinga resigned from FORD-Kenya to join the National Development Party (NDP).

Member of Parliament
In his first bid for the presidency in the 1997 General Election, Odinga finished third after President Moi, the incumbent, and Democratic Party candidate Mwai Kibaki. He however retained his position as the Langata MP.

KANU-NDP Merger (New KANU)
In a surprise move, Odinga decided to support Moi, his arch-enemy, even entering into a political merger between his party, NDP, and Moi's much-hated KANU party, which many Kenyans likened to the yoke of oppression. The merger was called New KANU. Previous admirers of Odinga now saw him as a sell-out to a cause he had once championed by closing ranks with a despot. He accepted a position in Moi's cabinet as Energy Minister, serving from June 2001 to 2002, during Moi's final term.

In the subsequent KANU elections held later that year, he was elected the party's Secretary General (replacing Joseph Kamotho). It was apparent to many that Odinga hoped to ascend to the presidency through KANU and with Moi's support.

In 2002, much to the chagrin of Odinga and many other hopefuls in the party, Moi endorsed Uhuru Kenyatta – son of Kenya's first president Jomo Kenyatta but a relative newcomer in politics – to be his successor. Moi publicly asked Odinga and others to support Uhuru as well. This was taken as an affront by many of the party loyalists who felt they were being asked to make way for a newcomer who, unlike them, had done little to build the party. Odinga and other KANU members, including Kalonzo Musyoka, George Saitoti and Joseph Kamotho, opposed this step arguing that the then 38-year-old Uhuru was politically inexperienced and lacked the leadership qualities needed to govern. Moi stood his ground, maintaining that the country's leadership needed to pass to the younger generation.

Dissent ran through the party with some members openly disagreeing with Moi, despite his reputation as an autocrat. It was then that the Rainbow Movement was founded, comprising disgruntled KANU members who exited KANU. The exodus, led by Odinga, saw most big names fleeing the party. Moi was left with his handpicked successor almost alone with a party reduced to an empty shell with poor electoral prospects. The Rainbow Movement went on to join the Liberal Democratic Party (LDP), which later teamed up with opposition Mwai Kibaki's National Alliance Party of Kenya (NAK), a coalition of several other parties, to form the National Rainbow Coalition (NARC).

National Rainbow Coalition (NARC)
Amid fears that this opposition "super alliance" would fail to unite and rally behind a common candidate as in previous occasions and thus easily hand victory to the government, Odinga declared "Kibaki tosha", Swahili for "Kibaki is sufficient", an endorsement of a Kibaki ticket. This resolved the matter of candidacy and Narc went on to defeat Moi's protege, Uhuru Kenyatta. The opposition won a landslide 67% of the vote, dealing a humiliating blow to Moi. Odinga led the campaign for Kibaki throughout the country while Kibaki was bedridden and incapacitated following an accident while on his way back to Nairobi from a campaign meeting at Machakos junction 40 kilometres (25 miles) from Nairobi in which he sustained injuries.

NARC MOU

On assuming office, President Kibaki did not appoint Odinga as Prime Minister in the new government, contrary to a pre-election Memorandum Of Understanding. (Kenya's constitution had no provision for Prime minister yet); neither did he give LDP (Odinga's faction) half of the cabinet positions as per the MOU. He instead sought to entrench and increase his own NAK's side in cabinet, even appointing MPs from the opposition parties (KANU and FORD people) to the cabinet.

The perceived "betrayal" started a simmering disquiet which in time led to an open rebellion and a split within the cabinet. A key point of disagreement was a proposed new constitution for the country, which was a major campaign issue that had united Kibaki's NAK and Odinga's LDP in the campaign. This constitution included provisions to trim presidential powers to rein in what was seen as an autocratic presidency, a feature of both the Moi and first president Jomo Kenyatta's regimes which had led to a lot of power abuse and an unaccountable leadership.

2005 referendum
Once in power however, Kibaki's government instituted a Constitutional Committee which turned around and submitted a draft constitution that was perceived to consolidate presidential powers and weaken regional governments, contrary to the pre-election draft.

Odinga opposed this and went on to campaign with his LDP cabinet colleagues on the referendum 'No' side, opposing the president and his lieutenants in a bruising countrywide campaign. When the document was put to a referendum on 21 November 2005, the government lost by a 57% to 43% margin. Embarrassingly for Kibaki, out of 8 provinces, only one (Central Province where his tribe the Kikuyu are dominant) voted "yes" for the document, isolating his own tribe from the rest of Kenya and exposing his campaign as ethnic-based.

A shell-shocked and disappointed President Kibaki sacked the entire cabinet on 23 November 2005. When it was reconstituted two weeks later, Odinga and the entire LDP group were left out.

Orange Democratic Movement (ODM)
Odinga led the formation of a new opposition outfit, the Orange Democratic Movement (ODM) – an Orange was the symbol for the "No" vote in the constitutional referendum.
In January 2006, Odinga was reported to have told police that he believed his life was in danger, having received assassination threats.

The Unconstitutional Swearing in as People's President 
Having lost the 2017 election to Uhuru Kenyatta and boycotted the rerun, Odinga had himself sworn in as "the people's president". Miguna Miguna, who administered the oath, was deported, while Odinga faced no consequences. He went on to have a handshake and take part in government decision making.

The handshake 
In March 2018, Raila and Uhuru had a political handshake intended to cool the political temperatures after the 2017 general elections. The handshake resulted in William Ruto being sidelined in the Government he formed with Uhuru Kenya, with Raila Odinga being elevated to Defacto Deputy President of the Republic of Kenya. The handshake gave birth to the Building Bridges Initiative alias BBI.

The Building Bridges Initiative 
Following the March 2018 truce between Odinga and President Kenyatta, the two commissioned a joint task force that would collect views from Kenyans and report their findings. After touring the country and holding consultative sessions, the team compiled and submitted the report to President Kenyatta at State House Nairobi on 26 November 2019 which was followed by a public launch at the Bomas of Kenya the following day. The efforts by President Kenyatta and Mr. Odinga to bring peace and cohesion in the country were applauded by several leaders locally and internationally with the duo being invited to a National Prayer Breakfast International Lunch in Washington DC, USA in February 2020. Supreme Court of Kenya would in 2022 uphold an earlier ruling made by the high court stating that the BBI was unconstitutional.

African Union Representative
Odinga was appointed High Representative for Infrastructure Development at the African Union Commission in 2018. He was relieved of his duties by the entity on 23rd February 2023, the day after he incited his supporters to violence through mass action.

Announcement of fifth bid For President 
On 10 December 2021, Odinga announced that he will be eyeing a fifth stab at the presidency, putting an end to months of suspense after his surprise truce with President Kenyatta. His announcement was made while launching the Azimio La Umoja Convention – which would be his vehicle to State House – held at the Kasarani Stadium, Nairobi.

Presidential elections

2007 presidential election
On 12 July 2007, with Kibaki's reelection bid drawing close, Odinga alleged that the government was withholding identity cards from voters in opposition strongholds with the intention to skew the election in favour of Kibaki. He also claimed that the intended creation of 30 new constituencies was a means by the government to fraudulently engineer victory in the December 2007 parliamentary election.

In August 2007, the Odinga's own Orange Democratic Movement-Kenya suffered a setback when it split into two, with Odinga becoming head of the Orange Democratic Movement (ODM) while the other faction, the ODM-K, was headed by Kalonzo Musyoka who parted ways with Odinga.

On 1 September 2007, the ODM elected Odinga as its presidential candidate in a National Delegates Conference held at the Moi International Sports Centre in Nairobi. Odinga received 2,656 votes; the only other candidates who received significant numbers of votes were Musalia Mudavadi with 391 and William Ruto with 368. Earlier, Najib Balala had withdrawn his candidature and endorsed Odinga. The defeated candidates expressed their support for Odinga afterwards, and Mudavadi was named as his running mate.

Odinga then launched his presidential campaign in Uhuru Park in Nairobi on 6 October 2007.

Odinga's bid for the presidency however failed when after the 27 December presidential election, the Electoral Commission declared Kibaki the winner on 30 December 2007, placing him ahead of Odinga by about 232,000 votes. Jeffrey Sachs (Professor of Economics and Director of the Earth Institute at Columbia University, and Special Advisor to former UN Secretary General) faulted the United States' approach to the post-election crisis and recommended an independent recount of the vote.

Odinga and his ODM leaders rallied against the decision with James Orengo and Prof. Nyong'o calling for mass action. Later violence broke out in the country.
The government's response was heavy-handed as it deployed police and paramilitary units to counter public protests.

Following two months of unrest, which led to the death of about 1000 people and displacement of about 250, 000, a deal between Odinga and Kibaki, which provided for power-sharing and the creation of the post of Prime Minister, was signed in February 2008; it was brokered by former UN Secretary General Kofi Annan. Odinga was sworn in as Prime Minister, along with the power-sharing Cabinet, on 17 April 2008. The post of Prime Minister was last held by Jomo Kenyatta between 1963 and 1964 following independence. Odinga is thus the second person in Kenya's history to hold the position.

2013 presidential election

The next presidential election in which Odinga was to run was the 2013 March poll, involving Kibaki's handover of power. Uncertainty loomed over Odinga's main rivals, Uhuru Kenyatta and William Ruto, who had both been indicted by the ICC of the Hague for their alleged role in the 2007 election violence. 
Despite their pending case, the duo had been nominated by the Jubilee party with Uhuru as presidential candidate and Ruto as running mate. 
Many felt they were unfit to run for office before clearing their names from such serious crimes while others felt that their opponents were trying to unfairly exploit the situation by eliminating them from the race and pave the way for their easy victory.

A Synovate survey released in October 2012 found Odinga to enjoy a leading 45 percent approval rate against Uhuru and Ruto.

Odinga's party, Orange Democratic Movement (ODM) joined Kalonzo Musyoka's Wiper Party and Moses Wetangula's Ford Kenya (FK) in a CORD coalition (Coalition for Reforms and Democracy) for the presidential race with Odinga as the presidential candidate and Kalonzo as his running mate to face Jubilee's coalition ( Uhuru Kenyatta's (The National Alliance – TNA), William Ruto's (United Republican Party – URP), Charity Ngilu's (National Rainbow Coalition – NARC) and Najib Balala's (Republican Congress – RC)).

A number of western countries were not in favour of the Uhuru and Ruto candidacy in view of their pending ICC cases and association with crimes against humanity. Former UN Secretary General Koffi Annan voiced his reservations, as did former US Assistant Secretary of State for African Affairs Johnnie Carson who cautioned against the election of Uhuru Kenyatta and William Ruto. He was notably quoted as saying that "Choices have consequences", referring to the fate of US-Kenyan relations, with a Uhuru administration.

Odinga ran for president in the elections held on 4 March 2013 and garnered 5,340,546 votes (43.70%) out of the 12,221,053 valid votes cast. The winner, Uhuru Kenyatta garnered 6,173,433 votes (50.51%). As this was above the 50% plus 1 vote threshold, Uhuru won it on the first round without requiring a run-off between the top two candidates.

The Independent Electoral and Boundaries Commission (IEBC) therefore officially declared Uhuru Kenyatta the president elect on Saturday 9 March at 2:44 pm. Uhuru was set to take office as Kenya's 4th president.

However, in a press conference shortly after the results were announced, Odinga said that the election had been marred by massive failures of the Biometric Voter Registration(BVR) kits, EVID (electronic voter identification or "Pollbooks"), RTS (results transmission system or "tallying system") and the RPS (results presentation or "transmissions system"). He claimed that the manual tallying was suspect leaving him no choice but to The Kenya Presidential Election Petition 2013 contest the result in Kenya's highest court, The Supreme Court.

In anticipation of the legal challenge, Odinga and his lawyers George Oraro, Mutula Kilonzo, and James Orengo, secretly instructed Raj Pal Senna, a Management Consultant from Barcelona to carry out a forensic investigation of the technology used in the Kenyan General Election 2013, during which the IEBC made claims on TV and media that there were "technological challenges", that servers overloaded and that the database crashed.

Kenya's chief justice Dr. Willy Mutunga announced on Monday, 11 March that the Supreme Court was fully formed and ready to deliver its judgements within 14 days as stipulated by the constitution of Kenya.

During the Petition hearing, Chief Justice Willy Mutunga made a finding rejecting the second affidavit of Odinga which comprised 900 pages, on the basis that it amounted to "new evidence" which is not permitted under the Constitution. Subsequently, the Supreme Court issued a ruling dismissing the petition on 30 March 2013. The Supreme Court while declaring Uhuru the next president also declared that the IEBC should not have included the invalid/spoilt votes in the calculation of the final figures and percentages.
Chief Justice Willy Mutunga also directed that the EACC (Ethics and Anti Corruption Commission) and the DPP (Director of Public Prosecutions) carry out a criminal investigation of the IEBC in relation to the BVR, EVID, RTS and RPS.

After the supreme court dismissed his petition Odinga flew to South Africa to avoid attending the Inauguration of Uhuru Kenyatta, held on 9 April 2013 at Moi Sports Complex at Kasarani, Nairobi. The swearing-in ceremony marked the end of his premiership.

In an important development, the full investigation findings were published as the OpCo Report on the website www.kenya-legal.com and inspired the documentary "50+1 – The Inside Story"  by KTN journalists John Namu and Mohammed Ali.

This documentary examines the history of election fraud and the history of corruption in the Judiciary, and in which Odinga claims that it cannot be ruled out that it was a deliberate act or omission by the Court not to subject the technical evidence to scrutiny because the outcome would invalidate the entire election process and discredit the IEBC.

2017 presidential elections

Claims of election rigging
Odinga, through his lawyers James Orengo, Otiende Amollo and Clifford Ochieng claimed that forces associated with his main competitor Uhuru Kenyatta had hacked into the IEBC (Kenya's electoral body) server and tampered with its database. He stated that the results that were being transmitted by IEBC were false because they had been manipulated via a computer algorithm designed to maintain an 11% gap between him and Uhuru's votes. As such, he proved the votes were not real votes cast by human voters but the outcome of a computer generated formula producing artificial values. This intrusion into IEBC's system, he further said, affected not just the presidential results but the entire election, including the votes cast for MPs, senators, governors and women representatives. He called the alleged intrusion "the biggest vote theft in Kenya's history". Later while vote tallying was still in progress and the country was awaiting the announcement of the final results, Odinga revealed that his team had received information from a confidential source in IEBC indicating that results from its server showed him leading with an unassailable 8 million votes over Uhuru's 7 million votes. Based on this, he demanded he be declared the fifth president of Kenya.

The IEBC however rejected Odinga's contention, saying the winner could not be announced before the tallying was complete and also being an independent body it could not be compelled by one of the candidates to announce the results.

The IEBC finally announced the results declaring Uhuru the winner with 8.2 million votes against Odinga's 6.7 million. The results showed massive losses for NASA, with Jubilee invading traditional NASA strongholds. NASA refused to recognize the results.

Shortly after Uhuru's declared victory, violence was reported in some parts of the country which are opposition strongholds. However the violence was not of the scale witnessed in the 2007 election aftermath and broke out only sporadically. Both Odinga and President Kenyatta called for public calm.

Annulment of the presidential election
After initially declining to take his case to court on the grounds that the court had previously made an unfavourable judgment against him, Odinga reconsidered and lodged a petition.

After 2 days of hearings, the judges in a majority 4–2 decision returned a verdict on 1 September annulling the presidential results and ordered a new election to be held within 60 days. The court decision, read by Chief Justice David Maraga and widely viewed as unprecedented both in Africa and globally, held that the IEBC failed to conduct the election in the manner provided by the Constitution and so could not stand.

Despite the Supreme Court ruling, Odinga announced his withdrawal from the presidential election, scheduled for 26 October, on 10 October. The reason for his withdrawal was his belief that the election would again not be free or fair, since no electoral process reforms had been made since the annulment of the last election, as well as various defections which occurred from his coalition.

The IEBC later stated that Odinga had not officially withdrawn from the race for presidency and his name would still appear on the ballot on 26 October among other candidates who contested the 8th August General Elections.

This resulted in violent uproar in various parts of the country some few days before and after the repeat polls especially in the NASA dominated zones. Alleged police brutality was reported as independent medic research organization (IMLU) cited 39 deaths and a high number of assault cases.

Swearing in of People's President, and reconciliation
On 30 January, Odinga staged a swearing-in ceremony in Nairobi where he named himself 'People's President'. Following this ceremony TV stations across Kenya were taken off air. A month and a half later, on 9 March, Odinga and president Uhuru Kenyatta made a joint televised appearance in which they referred to each other as 'brothers', and agreed to put aside political differences to allow Kenya to move forward.

2022 presidential elections 
– Odinga on 10 December 2021.

Odinga was cleared to run for the presidency for the fifth time on 5 June 2022 by the Independent Electoral and Boundaries Commission (IEBC). He filed his candidacy papers as a candidate for the Azimio la Umoja–One Kenya Coalition party with the IEBC. Martha Karua is Odinga's running mate.

On 6 June, Odinga launched his 10-point manifesto at the Nyayo stadium, flanked by his running mate, and hundreds of his supporters detailing his plan for the first 100 days in office if his camp carries the day in the August election.

Odinga outlined a key component of his vision for the country, dubbed "the People's Programmes", which he promised as the foundation for his platform. Social protection, universal healthcare, job development, women's empowerment, investing in youth, education for all, food security, water for everyone, enterprise Kenya, and building on past triumphs were all part of the ten-point plan.
He vied for presidency against United Democratic Alliance’s candidate William Ruto who garnered 50.5% of votes cast making Odinga Second. It was announced by IEBC chairman Wafula Chebukati.

After coming second in the presidential election, he filed a legal case challenging the result, which was dismissed by the Supreme Court. The 2022 presidential elections was widely perceived as his best and last chance attempt at the presidency.

Political positions
Odinga's political ideology can be loosely styled as social democracy, more closely aligned with American left-wing politics. His position was once in favour of a parliamentary system as seen when he initially backed a Constitution giving executive powers to a Prime Minister, but he subsequently changed to support a presidential system with a devolved power structure, which is reflected in Kenya's current constitution.

Among others, Odinga is seen as one of the main forces behind the devolution now enshrined in Kenya's constitution as an essential part of Kenya's governance system. This was inspired by a feeling that all successive governments under the centralized power structure had consistently abused that power to favour certain areas along political or ethnic lines while denying many regions access to resources and development because of their ethnicity or perceived disloyalty. Devolution aimed to address this and guarantee regions their fair share of resources regardless of their political affiliation or ethnicity.

Due to an economic downturn and extreme drought, Odinga has called for the suspension of taxes on fuels and certain foods that disproportionately impact the poor. Odinga has supported an element of state welfare in the form of cash-transfer programs to low-income people. This is currently implemented but in a limited way to poor, elderly people.

Nevertheless, on social issues, Odinga has taken a more conservative line. On LGBT issues, Odinga stated that "the constitution is very clear on this issue and men or women found engaging in homosexuality will not be spared", adding that "If we find a man engaging in homosexuality or a woman in lesbianism, we'll arrest them and put them in jail". These comments were widely condemned from LGBT activists, who stated that his rhetoric put the lives of LGBT Kenyans in danger. In response, his office walked back Odinga's statement, claiming he only meant to clarify that same-sex marriage is illegal under the constitution.

Personal life

Baptised as an Anglican Christian in the Church Missionary Society (CMS) in his childhood, Odinga later became a Born-Again Christian and is a communicant member of All Saints' Cathedral in Nairobi.

Odinga is married to Ida Odinga (Ida Anyango Oyoo). They live in Karen, Nairobi and have a second home at Central Farm in Siaya County. The couple had four children: Fidel (1973–2015), Rosemary (born 1977), Raila Jr. (born 1979) and Winnie (born 1990). Fidel was named after Fidel Castro and Winnie after Winnie Mandela. Winnie is currently studying Communication and International Area Studies as a double major student at Drexel University in Philadelphia.She is also a Kenyan representative at East Africa Legislative Assembly (EALA).

In an interview with BBC News in January 2008, Odinga asserted that he was the first cousin of US president Barack Obama through Obama's father. However, Barack Obama's paternal uncle denied any direct relation to Odinga, stating "Odinga's mother came from this area, so it is normal for us to talk about cousins. But he is not a blood relative."

Odinga briefly played soccer for Luo Union (now Gor Mahia) as a midfielder.

Odinga was appointed by the African Union to mediate the 2010–2011 Ivorian crisis, which involved Alassane Ouattara and Laurent Gbagbo.
Odinga wrote "Flame of Freedom" a 1040-page autobiography which talks about his life from childhood. It was launched on 6 October 2013 in Kenya and subsequently in United States on 15 October 2013. He was accompanied by a number of Kenyan county governors.

Controversy

Miguna Miguna claims 
During his premiership, Odinga appointed Miguna Miguna as his advisor on coalition affairs, whom he later suspended in August 2011, citing "gross misconduct". The Daily Nation quoted his reason for suspension as being "accused of misrepresenting the office of the Prime Minister, possibly a reference to his having aired strong views which may have embarrassed the PM". Miguna Miguna later published controversial books about his working relationship with Odinga. According to one of Miguna Miguna's books, Peeling Back the Mask: A quest for justice in Kenya, instances of abuse of office, corruption, political trickery as well as public deception were planned, coordinated and covered up in Odinga's office in the three years where he worked there as an advisor of Odinga.

His suspension came at a time when the electoral body, the IIEC, was in an uproar and unsettled by anonymously authored complaints which the commissioners characterise as a hate campaign but which raise troubling questions on corruption and nepotism. Later Miguna, after suspension, issued a statement that said he "was instructed to write my article on the IIEC chairman and the position he had taken with respect to the party's decision to kick out rebellious MPs and Councillors". He later denied this, according to the Nairobi Star.

Maize scandal 
During Raila Odinga's tenure, The Office of the Prime Minister was implicated in the 'Kazi kwa Vijana scandal' whereby a World Bank funded project was suspended due to embezzlement of funds. Similarly, the 'Maize scandal' whereby aflatoxin contaminated maize was imported into Kenya was also linked to The Office of the Prime Minister leading to the suspension of Odinga's top aides Permanent Secretary Mohammed Isahakia and Chief of Staff Caroli Omondi. Tyson Omondi

2019 gold scam 
Odinga has been reportedly linked to a 2019 multi-million dollar advance-fee scam of non-existent and "fake gold" in Kenya by a number of politicians from both sides of the political divide in Kenya. According to the reports UAE Prime Minister Mohammed bin Rashid Al Maktoum's cousin lost money in disguised transactions for non-existent or otherwise "fake gold" in Kenya. In May 2019, in a leaked video recording, a voice of Moses Wetangula, the then senator of Bungoma, appeared to implicate Odinga in a gold deal gone sour, a deal in which millions of dollars were lost by the UAE royal family in an advance fee scam of non-existent gold in Kenya. In the same video as was reported Wetangula claimed Odinga runs ODM like a gestapo where nothing happens without his concessions, and that Odinga met the president to explain the matter of the gold deal. In the same month Odinga claimed that he was the one that outed the confidence tricksters to the Dubai-based complainants. Later in the same month a number of political leaders in Kenya called for Odinga to be investigated by the DCI for international conmanship. The legislators claimed they had compelling evidence against Odinga. According to them Odinga cannot be part of a criminal transaction and then claim to be a whistleblower at the same time, whilst being a direct individual beneficiary of proceeds of the scam.

Misinformation on various social media 
During the August 2022 Kenyan General Elections, Raila Odinga was the subject of several false claims and fake news. 

One example of misinformation involved a fabricated image of a banknote with Raila Odinga's face on it. This image was circulated on social media, and some people believed that it was a legitimate banknote. However, fact-checkers confirmed that the image was a satire and not a real banknote. 

Misinformation can also be spread through old or outdated photos. For example, a photo claiming to show Raila Odinga collapsing at his Karen home was circulated on social media. It was found that the photo was not recent and had been taken out of context. Video footage can also be manipulated to spread false information. A video claiming to show Raila Odinga partying while William Ruto was at the presidential campaign was shared on social media. However, PesaCheck confirmed that the video was fake and had been doctored. Photos were circulated that claimed to show youth disrupting Raila Odinga's rally in Embakasi, Nairobi. However, PesaCheck confirmed that the photos were not related to the rally, and they were taken at a different location.

It was falsely claimed that Azimio's Narok gubernatorial candidate, Moitalel Ole Kenta, had disowned Raila Odinga. PesaCheck found that the claim was false, and Moitalel Ole Kenta had not made any such statement. A fake tweet attributed to William Ruto was circulated on social media, congratulating Raila Odinga for winning the 2022 presidential election. PesaCheck confirmed that the tweet was fake and had not been posted by William Ruto.

Another fake congratulatory statement allegedly from the US Embassy in Nairobi was circulating on social media where Raila Odinga was being applauded on his ‘win’ in the 9 August 2022 Kenyan general elections. This statement was looked into by PesaCheck who found out that the statement was FAKE. To firm this up, Andrew Veveiros who is the embassy spokesperson also shared an email to PesaCheck to dismiss the congratulatory statement by the US Embassy to Raila Odinga. 

Doctored presidential election results were also being shared across different media platforms. Of key interest was a fake statement shared on Facebook claiming that two local media houses i.e Royal Media Services and The Standard Group had called the elections in favour of Raila Odinga. According to this fake statement, Raila Odinga was leading the 2022 Presidential elections with 51.13% while William Samoei Ruto was at 48.22%. These claims were denounced by the media houses' senior editors and PesaCheck also confirmed that they were indeed fake.

Honours and awards

Honorary degrees

See also 
Luo people of Kenya and Tanzania
Raila Odinga Biography

References

Further reading

External links

Profile on BBC
Profile on Aljazeera
Raila Odinga – Profile

|-

|-

|-

|-

|-

|-

|-

|-

|-

|-

1945 births
Candidates for President of Kenya
Forum for the Restoration of Democracy – Kenya politicians
Kenyan Anglicans
Kenyan democracy activists
Kenyan Luo people
Kenyan Luo politicians
Leipzig University alumni
Living people
Members of the National Assembly (Kenya)
National Development Party (Kenya) politicians
Orange Democratic Movement politicians
People from Kisumu County
Prime Ministers of Kenya
Prisoners and detainees of Kenya
Alumni of Maranda High School
Leaders of political parties in Kenya